General R. M. Daya Ratnayake, WWV, RWP, RSP, USP is a former senior Sri Lanka Army officer. He was the 20th Commander of the Sri Lanka Army and is the current Secretary to the Ministry of Industries and former Chairman, Sri Lanka Ports Authority.

Education 
He was educated at  Maliyadeva College, Kurunegala.

Military career
He started his military career as an officer cadet in 1980 and received his basic training at the Sri Lanka Military Academy. He was commissioned as a second lieutenant in 1981 in the Sri Lanka Light Infantry. He thereafter completed the Commando Officers Course, Infantry Young Officers Course and the Battalion Support Weapon Course. He had completed the Junior Command and Senior Command Courses at the Army War College, Mhow. From January 1993 to January 1996, Ratnayake served as commanding officer of the 6th Battalion, Sri Lanka Light Infantry. He attended the graduated from Defence Service Command and Staff College, Bangladesh; the National Defence University, China and the Army Intelligence School, Fort Huachuca. He has followed the Governance and Management of Defence Course at Cranfield University, UK, Higher Level Security Studies Diploma Course and Advanced Communication Skills Course in Asia-Pacific Centre for Security Studies in Honolulu, Hawaii. He commanded the 6th Battalion Sri Light Infantry Regiment. He served as the General Officer Commanding of 23 Infantry Division in the Eastern province. He played important roles in the operations of Liberations of Vakare and Thoppigala. He also held the post of the Commissioner General Rehabilitation for rehabilitation of 12,000 ex-LTTE combatants under the Bureau of the Commissioner General Rehabilitation. His other notable appointments include Commanding Officer of Sri Lanka Military Academy and Director Media and Military Spokesman for the Ministry of Defence. On 1 August 2013, he became the 20th commander of the Sri Lanka Army and promoted to the post of a Lieutenant General simultaneously.

He was succeeded by Lieutenant General Crishantha de Silva in February 2015. The outgoing commander was promoted to the rank of full general by President Maithripala Sirisena.

Later work
He was appointed Chairman, Sri Lanka Ports Authority in 2019 by President Gotabaya Rajapaksa and in 2021 he was appointed Secretary to the Ministry of Industries.

Family
He is married to Priyadarshani Damayanthi and has two sons and a daughter.

Awards and decorations
He got many awards including Weera Wickrema Vibushanaya (WWV), Rana Wickrama Padakkama (RWP) (Awarded four times for Exceptional Gallantry), Rana Sura Padakkama (RSP) (Awarded four times for Gallantry), Uttama Seva Padakkama (USP) (For distinguished conduct) and Desha Puthra Padakkama (DPP) (For wounded in combat). He has been recognized as the most decorated officer to have been made the commander.

References

External links
Sri Lankan Ports Authority directors
Commander of the Army
Daya Ratnayake bio

Permanent secretaries of Sri Lanka
Commanders of the Sri Lanka Army
Living people
Sri Lankan full generals
Sinhalese military personnel
Year of birth missing (living people)
Army War College, Mhow alumni